is a former Japanese football player. She played for Japan national team.

National team career
Jashima was born on December 26, 1959. On September 6, 1981, she debuted for Japan national team against England.

National team statistics

References

1959 births
Living people
Japanese women's footballers
Japan women's international footballers
Tasaki Perule FC players
Women's association footballers not categorized by position